IREDES, International Rock Excavation Data Exchange Standard, is an industry standard to unify routines for the data exchange between mining equipment and office computer systems. It defines one "common electronic language" to be talked by the automation systems throughout the mine. In year 2000, IREDES was founded by the major players in the mining industry. Since then, the standard was developed, built and tested.

Background
Modern mining machines today is controlled electronically via network. This kind of equipment provides enormous amount of electronic reports and data. Before IREDES, there was no way of cost effectively exchanging the process information with databases, simulation tools and other enterprise level software. Any data exchange problem had to be solved by individual and expensive software development projects. To solve this problem, IREDES was founded to unify the data exchange format and method such that individual development effort can be minimized.

Innovations
The development of IREDES is to achieve the following:
Easy integration of multi vendor machine installations into data controlled mining process
Reduce cost of individual interface development for machine manufactures, mining companies and system suppliers
Create new markets for off-the-shelf software and systems to be used in automated mining processes
Form a data acquisition basis for integration of the mining process into enterprise level modeling, cost analysis and decision finding systems.
Set up unique, standardized definitions on the content of all parameters used in IREDES to ensure the parameters are meaning the same when they are provided by different systems. Thereby the machines are not only able to "talk" but also to "understand" each other.

Organization
IREDES is a not-for-profit organization located in Ladbergen, Germany. It is jointly financed by the member companies on a cost sharing basis.
The standard documents are open to the public. They are accessible free of charge for members. Non-members can purchase the documents from the IREDES office for a small amount of contribution to the standardization work.

Data Profiles
All the data profiles are based on Extensible Markup Language (XML). This is due to the high extendability and interoperability of the language. The current data profiles created with the contribution of board members are Drilling rig and LHD trucks. More profiles will be added in the future if needed.

External links
IREDES initiative

Mining equipment